The 2015 Ubet Perth Super Sprint was a motor race for V8 Supercars held from 1–3 May 2015. It was the third round of fourteen in the 2015 International V8 Supercars Championship.

On Saturday, Prodrive Racing Australia's Chaz Mostert scored his first V8 Supercar pole position for Race 7, while teammate Mark Winterbottom scored pole position for Race 8. Winterbottom took the lead from Mostert at the start of Race 7 and did not look back, taking the first championship win for the Ford FG X Falcon in V8 Supercars. Jamie Whincup could only manage to finish 15th after starting 21st on the grid. Winterbottom also won Race 8 from starting on pole, ahead of Whincup and Fabian Coulthard.

Mostert scored another pole position for Race 9 on Sunday, with Winterbottom starting alongside, completing a weekend front-row lockout for Prodrive Racing Australia. With Craig Lowndes looking towards his 100th career race win, it was looking certain after compulsory pit stops were completed. With 10 laps remaining, Erebus Motorsport's Will Davison was quick to catch up to Lowndes and managed to pass him with 5 laps remaining. Davison took the race win – his first since the 2013 Sucrogen Townsville 400 and his first in a Mercedes-Benz. Lowndes held on to second place, while Coulthard scored another podium finish.

Results

Race 7

Race 8

Race 9

Championship standings
 After Race 9 of 36

Drivers' Championship standings

Teams' Championship standings

 Note: Only the top five positions are included for both sets of standings.

References

Barbagallo
May 2015 sports events in Australia